Blommersia sarotra is a species of frogs in the family Mantellidae.

It is endemic to Madagascar.
Its natural habitats are subtropical or tropical moist lowland forests, subtropical or tropical swamps, subtropical or tropical moist montane forests, swamps, and heavily degraded former forest.
It is threatened by habitat loss.

Species Characteristics 
Blommersia sarotra sustain typical characteristics of a single subgular vocal sac, short hands, and an elongated head like most other species in the Blommersia genus. However, the distinguishing traits of the species Blommersia sarotra include the presence of a white mark on their throats, lack of vomerine teeth, and a unique mating call composed of a long pulsed note, followed by clicking.

References

Sources
Glaw, F. R. A. N. K; M., Veneces (2002). "A new sibling species of the anuran subgenus Blommersia from Madagascar (Amphibia: Mantellidae: Mantidactylus) and its molecular phylogenetic relationships". Herpetological journal. 12.1: 11–20 – via Science Citation Index [SCI] - ISI Web of Knowledge.

Mantellidae
Endemic frogs of Madagascar
Amphibians described in 2002
Taxonomy articles created by Polbot